Thomas Shaw was an English author and historian, born in Manchester in 1916 who spent thirty- four years in Cornwall as a Methodist minister. He is best known as the author of many books on Cornish Methodism. In 1961 he was made a bard of the Cornish Gorsedd taking the bardic name 'Ystoryer Methysyeth' in recognition of his studies in Cornish Methodism.

Works
 Menhinick Family: the History and Genealogy of a Cornish family (1950)
 The Bible Christians 1815-1907 (1961)
 Methodism in Probus, 1781-1961 (1961)
 Methodism in the Camelford and Wadebridge Circuit (1963)
 A History of Cornish Methodism (1967)
 Foolish Dick and his Chapel: The Story of Porthtowan Methodism 1796-1967
 Thomas Treffrey Senior (1969)
 The Pastoral Crook- Religion in Cornwall in the Mid- nineteenth century (1969)
 A Methodist Guide to Cornwall (updated by Colin Short, 2005)

Death
Shaw died in 2001, aged 85 and was buried at Chapel Amble Methodist cemetery.

References

1916 births
2001 deaths
English Methodist ministers
Burials in Cornwall
Cornish Methodists
Clergy from Manchester
Bards of Gorsedh Kernow